{{Infobox rail line
| box_width       = 
| name            = Toei Ōedo Line
| native_name     = 大江戸線
| native_name_lang= ja
| other_name      = E
| linenumber      = 12
| color           = 
| mapcolor        =  Ruby (#b6007a) Magenta (#8B008B)
| logo            = Toei Oedo line symbol.svg
| logo_width      = 50px
| image           = Toei-subway12-600.jpg
| image_width     = 300px
| caption         = A Toei 12-600 series train on the Ōedo Line
| type            = Rapid transit
| system          = Tokyo subway
| status          = 
| locale          = Tokyo
| start           = 
| end             = 
| stations        = 38
| routes          = 
| daily_ridership = 933,621 (2016)
| open            =  (First section) (Entire line)
| close           = 
| owner           = 
| operator        = Toei Subway
| character       = 
| depot           = Kiba
| stock           = Toei 12-000 and Toei 12-600 series
| linelength      = 
| tracklength     = 
| tracks          = Double-track
| maxincline      = 5.0%
| minradius       = 
| signalling      = Cab signalling, Closed block
| trainprotection = New CS-ATC, ATO
| gauge           =  with linear induction motor between
| electrification =  (overhead line)
| speed           = 
| elevation       = 
| map_state       = collapsed
| map             = 
{{Routemap| title = Toei Ōedo Line| title-color = white| title-bg = #8B008B| width = 400px |inline=yes
| map = ~~km~~
tKBHFa~~0.0~~Tochomae
HUBc2\tBHF!~HUB3\~~0.8~~
hCONTgq\hSTRq\hKBHFeq!~HUB1\tSTR!~HUBc4\\\~~Seibu Shinjuku Line
HUBc2\tBHF!~HUB3\~~2.2~~
tCONTgq\tSTRq\tBHFq!~HUB1\tKRZt!~HUBc4\tSTRq\tSTRq\tCONTfq~~ 
tBHF~~3.2~~
tBHF~~3.8~~
tBHF~~4.8~~
\\\tSTR\tSTR+l\tSTRq\tCONTfq~~ 
\\\tSTR\tSTR\hSTR+l\hCONTfq~~JR Chūō-Sōbu Line
\HUBrg\tBHF!~HUBq\tBHF!~HUBq\hBHF!~HUBeq~~5.8~~
tCONTgq\tSTRq\tBHFq!~HUB\tKRZt\tKRZt\hKRZt\tCONTfq~~ 
tCONTgq\tSTRq\tBHFq!~HUBe\tKRZt\tKRZt\hKRZt\tCONTfq~~ 
\\\tSTR\tSTR\hSTRl\hCONTfq~~JR Chūō-Sōbu Line
\\\tSTR\tSTRl\tSTRq\tCONTfq~~ Namboku Line
HUBrg\tBHF!~HUBeq\~~6.8~~
tCONTgq\tSTRq\tBHFq!~HUB\tKRZt\tSTRq\tSTRq\tCONTfq~~ 
tCONTgq\tSTRq\tBHFq!~HUB\tKRZt\tSTRq\tSTRq\tCONTfq~~ Namboku Line (at )
tCONTgq\tSTRq\tBHFq!~HUBe\tKRZt\tSTR+r\\~~  (at Korakuen)
\tBHF!~HUBaq\tBHF!~HUBeq~~7.6~~
\\\tSTR\tSTRl\tSTRq\tCONTfq~~ Marunouchi Line
HUBrg\tBHF!~HUBeq\~~8.7~~
tCONTgq\tSTRq\tBHFq!~HUB\tKRZt\tSTRq\tSTRq\tCONTfq~~  (at )
tCONTgq\tSTRq\tBHFq!~HUB\tKRZt\tSTRq\tSTRq\tCONTfq~~  (at )
hCONTgq\hSTRq\hBHFq!~HUB\tKRZh\hSTRq\hSTRq\hCONTfq~~JR Yamanote Line (at )
hCONTgq\hSTRq\hBHFq!~HUBe\tKRZh\hSTRq\hSTRq\hCONTfq~~JR Keihin-Tōhoku Line (at Okachimachi)
\\\tSTR\tSTR+l\tSTRq\tCONTfq~~Tsukuba Express
\tBHF!~HUBaq\tBHF!~HUBeq~~9.5~~
\\\tSTR\tSTRl\tSTRq\tCONTfq~~Tsukuba Express
HUBc2\tBHF!~HUB3\~~10.5~~
tCONTgq\tSTRq\tBHFq!~HUB1\tKRZt!~HUBc4\tSTRq\tSTRq\tCONTfq~~ 
HUBc2\tBHF!~HUB3\~~11.7~~
hCONTgq\hSTRq\hBHFq!~HUB1\tKRZh!~HUBc4\hSTRq\hSTRq\hCONTfq~~JR Chūō-Sōbu Line
HUBc2\tBHF!~HUB3\~~12.7~~
tCONTgq\tSTRq\tBHFq!~HUB1\tKRZt!~HUBc4\tSTRq\tSTRq\tCONTfq~~Toei Shinjuku Line
HUBc2\tBHF!~HUB3\~~13.3~~
tCONTgq\tSTRq\tBHFq!~HUB1\tKRZt!~HUBc4\tSTRq\tSTRq\tCONTfq~~ 
\tABZgl\tKDSTeq~~Kiba depot
HUBc2\tBHF!~HUB3\~~14.5~~
tCONTgq\tSTRq\tBHFq!~HUB1\tKRZt!~HUBc4\tSTRq\tSTRq\tCONTfq~~ 
HUBc2\tBHF!~HUB3\~~15.9~~Tsukishima
tCONTgq\tSTRq\tBHFq!~HUB1\tKRZt!~HUBc4\tSTRq\tSTRq\tCONTfq~~ 
tBHF~~16.7~~
tBHF~~18.2~~
HUBc2\tBHF!~HUB3\~~19.1~~
hCONTgq\hSTRq\hBHFq!~HUB1\tKRZh!~HUBc4\hSTRq\hSTRq\hCONTfq~~Yurikamome Line
hCONTgq\hSTRq\hBHFq!~HUBa\tKRZh\hSTRq\hSTRq\hCONTfq~~JR Yamanote Line (at )
hCONTgq\hSTRq\hBHFq!~HUB\tKRZh\hSTRq\hSTRq\hCONTfq~~JR Keihin-Tōhoku Line (at Hamamatsuchō)
\\hKBHFaq!~HUB\tKRZh\hSTRq\hSTRq\hCONTfq~~Tokyo Monorail (at Hamamatsuchō)
HUBtl\tBHF!~HUBeq\~~20.0~~
tCONTgq\tSTRq\tBHFq!~HUBe\tKRZt\tSTRq\tSTRq\tCONTfq~~' tBHF~~21.3~~
HUBc2\tBHF!~HUB3\~~22.1~~
tCONTgq\tSTRq\tBHFq!~HUB1\tKRZt!~HUBc4\tSTRq\tSTRq\tCONTfq~~ HUBc2\tBHF!~HUB3\~~23.2~~Roppongi
tCONTgq\tSTRq\tBHFq!~HUB1\tKRZt!~HUBc4\tSTRq\tSTRq\tCONTfq~~ HUBrg\tBHF!~HUBeq\~~24.5~~
tCONTgq\tSTRq\tBHFq!~HUB\tKRZt\tSTRq\tSTRq\tCONTfq~~ tCONTgq\tSTRq\tBHFq!~HUBe\tKRZt\tSTRq\tSTRq\tCONTfq~~ \\\tSTR\hSTR+l\hSTRq\hCONTfq~~JR Chūō-Sōbu Line (at Sendagaya)
\tBHF!~HUBaq\hBHF!~HUBeq~~25.7~~
\\\tSTR\hSTR\hSTR+l\hCONTfq~~JR Yamanote Line/JR Shōnan-Shinjuku Line\\tBHF!~HUBaq\hBHF!~HUBq\hBHF!~HUBeq~~27.2~~
hCONTgq\hSTRq\hSTR+r\tSTR\hSTR\hSTR\~~JR Saikyō LineHUBrg\hBHF!~HUBq\tBHF!~HUBq\hBHF!~HUBq\hBHF!~HUBeq~~27.8~~
tCONTgq\tBHFq!~HUB\hKRZt\tKRZt\hKRZt\hKRZt\tCONTfq~~ tCONTgq\tBHFq!~HUB\hKRZt\tKRZt\hKRZt\hKRZt\tCONTfq~~  thoroughfare to Keio New LineCONTgq\KBHFeq!~HUB\hSTR\tSTR\hSTR\hSTR\~~Odakyu Odawara LinehCONTgq\hKBHFeq!~HUB\hSTR\tSTR\hSTR\hSTR\~~Seibu Shinjuku LinetCONTgq\tKBHFeq!~HUBe\hSTR\tSTR\hSTR\hSTR\~~Keio LinehCONTgq\hSTRq\hSTRr\tSTR\hSTR\hSTR\~~JR Saikyo Line\\\tSTR\hSTR\hSTRl\hCONTfq~~JR Yamanote Line\\\tSTR\hSTRl\hSTRq\hCONTfq~~JR Chūō-Sōbu LinetBHF~~28.6~~
tBHF~~29.4~~
HUBrg\tBHF!~HUBeq\~~30.6~~
tCONTgq\tSTRq\tBHFq!~HUB\tKRZt\tSTRq\tSTRq\tCONTfq~~Marunouchi LinetCONTgq\tSTRq\tKBHFeq!~HUBe\tSTR\\\~~Marunouchi Branch LineHUBc2\tBHF!~HUB3\~~31.6~~
hCONTgq\hSTRq\hBHFq!~HUB1\tKRZh!~HUBc4\hSTRq\hSTRq\hCONTfq~~JR Chūō-Sōbu LineHUBc2\tBHF!~HUB3\~~32.4~~
CONTgq\STRq\BHFq!~HUB1\tKRZ!~HUBc4\STRq\STRq\CONTfq~~Seibu Shinjuku LinetBHF~~33.7~~
tBHF~~35.3~~
\tBHF!~HUB2\HUBc3~~36.9~~
CONTgq\STRq\ABZq+l\tKRZ!~HUBc1\BHFq!~HUB4\STRq\CONTfq~~Seibu Ikebukuro LinetKBHFe!~HUBaq\tBHF!~HUBeq\~~37.8~~
tBHF~~39.3~~
tKBHFe~~40.7~~ }}
}}

The  is a subway line in Tokyo, Japan, operated by the Tokyo Metropolitan Bureau of Transportation (Toei). It commenced full operations on December 12, 2000; using the Japanese calendar this reads "12/12/12" as the year 2000 equals Heisei 12. The line is completely underground, making it the second-longest railway tunnel in Japan after the Seikan Tunnel.

On maps and signboards, the line is shown in magenta. Stations carry the letter "E" followed by a two-digit number inside a more pinkish ruby circle.

Overview
The Ōedo Line is the first Tokyo subway line to use linear motor propulsion (and the second in Japan after the Osaka Metro Nagahori Tsurumi-ryokuchi Line), which allows it to use smaller cars and smaller tunnels (a benefit similarly achieved by the Advanced Rapid Transit system manufactured by Bombardier). This technology, though, is incompatible with other railway and subway lines, which can only operate with vehicles utilizing conventional rotary motors, thus preventing Ōedo Line trains from operating through services onto them. Although vehicles with rotary motor propulsion can technically operate on the Ōedo Line, its smaller tunnels and loading gauge prevents such occurrences, hence making the Ōedo Line the first self-enclosed subway line in Tokyo in over 40 years, and the first such line operated by Toei.

Originally budgeted at ¥682.6 billion and 6 years, the construction ended up taking nearly 10 years and estimates of the final cost of construction range from the official ¥988.6 billion to over ¥1,400 billion yen, making it the most expensive subway line ever built. (Yokohama's Minato Mirai Line, however, was even costlier if measured per kilometer.)

Ridership projections originally estimated 1 million users daily, a figure scaled down to 820,000 before opening. At the end of 2006, the line was averaging 720,000 passengers/day. However, its ridership has increased by about five percent each year since its opening, following new commercial and residential development around major stations such as Roppongi and Shiodome.  According to the Tokyo Metropolitan Bureau of Transportation, as of June 2009 the Ōedo Line was the fourth most crowded subway line in Tokyo, at its peak running at 178% capacity between Monzen-Nakachō and Tsukishima stations.

Construction of the first segment to Ōizumigakuenchō is tentatively scheduled for before 2015, and will include the construction of three new stations, temporarily named Doshida station, Ōizumichō station and Ōizumigakuenchō station. Following the awarding of the 2020 Summer Olympics to Tokyo, there has been speculation regarding the addition of another  to the proposed extension in order to extend the line to Niiza where the shooting range for the Olympics is to be located. A decision regarding this matter is expected in 2015.

Services
The Ōedo Line runs in a loop around central Tokyo before branching out towards Nerima in the western suburbs, meaning the line is shaped like a figure 6 lying on its side. It is not a true loop line: trains from the western Hikarigaoka terminus run anticlockwise around the loop and terminate at the intermediate Tochōmae Station facing towards Hikarigaoka, and vice versa. The arrangement is very much like the London Underground Circle Line since 2009, but does not share any track segments with other lines.

The full  trip from Tochōmae around the loop and onward to Hikarigaoka takes 81 minutes. Trains operate once every three to five minutes during rush hours, and once every six minutes during off-peak weekday hours, weekends and holidays.

Station list

All stations are located in Tokyo.

Rolling stock

Toei 12-000 series 8-car EMU trainsets
Toei 12-600 series 8-car EMU trainsets

Oedo Line trains are housed and maintained at the Kiba depot, located underneath Kiba Park to the southeast of Kiyosumi-Shirakawa Station. Prior to the completion of the Oedo Line loop in 2000, servicing was performed at a depot near Hikarigaoka Station.

Major overhaul work for Oedo Line trains is performed at the Magome depot, located south of Nishi-Magome Station on the Toei Asakusa Line. Oedo Line trains access this facility using a connecting tunnel to the Asakusa Line near Shiodome Station. Because of differences in infrastructure and technology used preventing trains on either line from accessing the other, a special Toei Class E5000 locomotive powers these ferry runs during overnight hours when the subway is closed.

History

The Ōedo Line was first proposed in 1968 as an incomplete loop line from Shinjuku around northern and eastern Tokyo to Azabu. This plan was amended in 1972 to complete the loop back to Shinjuku, extend it to Hikarigaoka and add a spur line to Mejiro from the northern side. The Tokyo Metropolitan Government undertook construction of the line, which was initially called .

The first segment from Hikarigaoka to Nerima began operations on 10 December 1991. The line was extended from Nerima to Shinjuku on 19 December 1997, and later from Shinjuku to Kokuritsu-Kyōgijō on 20 April 2000.

With this extension, Shintaro Ishihara, the governor of Tokyo, named the line "Toei Oedo Line", where Oedo'' literally means "Great Edo", a reference to Tokyo's former name. As was the case with earlier lines, the public was initially polled to select a name; however, Ishihara rejected the chosen name, on the grounds that it would not initially form a complete loop, and that calling it such would cause confusion with the Yamanote Line and the Osaka Loop Line.

The full line began operation on 12 December 2000. An additional station (Shiodome Station) was opened on 2 November 2002 to connect to the Yurikamome guideway transit line. Following the addition of Shiodome, the automated announcements in the trains were changed to advertise businesses and facilities near each station, a first in Tokyo (although this was already the practice on the municipal subways of Osaka and Nagoya).

Future plans 
Starting on 18 January 2023, car 4 on all services on the Oedo line were designated as a women-only car in a bid by the railway operator to reduce sexual assaults onboard trains. The restriction is in effect during the morning peak hour.

Notes 

a. Crowding levels defined by the Ministry of Land, Infrastructure, Transport and Tourism:

100% — Commuters have enough personal space and are able to take a seat or stand while holding onto the straps or hand rails.
150% — Commuters have enough personal space to read a newspaper.
180% — Commuters must fold newspapers to read.
200% — Commuters are pressed against each other in each compartment but can still read small magazines.
250% — Commuters are pressed against each other, unable to move.

See also

 List of railway lines in Japan
 London Underground Circle Line , Bangkok MRT Blue Line and Hamburg U3, three metro lines with similar arrangements

References

External links

 Toei Transportation Information

 
Oedo
Railway loop lines
Standard gauge railways in Japan
Railway lines opened in 1991
1991 establishments in Japan